Tshilenge is a city in Kasai-Oriental Province, in eastern Democratic Republic of the Congo.

References

Populated places in Kasaï-Oriental